The First Turkic Khaganate, also referred to as the First Turkic Empire, the Turkic Khaganate or the Göktürk Khaganate, was a Turkic khaganate established by the Ashina clan of the Göktürks in medieval Inner Asia under the leadership of Bumin Qaghan (d. 552) and his brother Istämi. The First Turkic Khaganate succeeded the Rouran Khaganate as the hegemonic power of the Mongolian Plateau and rapidly expanded their territories in Central Asia, and became the first Central Asian transcontinental empire from Manchuria to the Black Sea.

Although the Göktürks spoke Old Turkic, the Khaganate's early official texts and coins were written in Sogdian. It was the first Turkic state to use the name Türk politically. Old Turkic script was invented at the first half of the 6th century.

The Khaganate collapsed in 603, after a series of conflicts and civil wars which separated the polity into the Eastern Turkic Khaganate and Western Turkic Khaganate. The Tang Empire conquered the Eastern Turkic Khaganate in 630, and conquered the Western Turkic Khaganate in 657 in a series of military campaigns. The Second Turkic Khaganate emerged in 682 and lasted until 744 when it was overthrown by the Uyghur Khaganate.

First Khaganate

 
The origins of the Turkic Khanate trace back to 546, when Bumin Qaghan made a preemptive strike against the Uyghur and Tiele groups planning a revolt against their overlords, the Rouran Khanate. For this service he expected to be rewarded with a Rouran princess, thus marrying into the royal family. However, the Rouran khagan, Yujiulü Anagui, sent an emissary to Bumin to rebuke him, saying, "You are my blacksmith slave. How dare you utter these words?" As Anagui's "blacksmith slave" comment was recorded in Chinese chronicles, some claim that the Göktürks were indeed blacksmith servants for the Rouran elite, and that "blacksmith slavery" may have indicated a form of vassalage within Rouran society. According to Denis Sinor, this reference indicates that the Türks specialized in metallurgy, although it is unclear if they were miners or, indeed, blacksmiths. Whatever the case, that the Turks were "slaves" need not be taken literally, but probably represented a form of vassalage, or even unequal alliance.

A disappointed Bumin allied with the Western Wei against the Rouran, their common enemy. In 552, Bumin defeated Anagui and his forces north of Huaihuang (modern Zhangjiakou, Hebei).

Having excelled both in battle and diplomacy, Bumin declared himself Illig Khagan of the new khanate at Otukan, but died only months later. His son, Muqan Qaghan, defeated the Hephthalite Empire, Khitan and Kyrgyz. Bumin's brother Istämi (d. 576) bore the title "Yabgu of the West" and collaborated with the Sassanid Empire of Iran to defeat and destroy the Hephthalites, who were allies of the Rouran. This war tightened the Ashina clan's grip on the Silk Road.

The appearance of the Pannonian Avars in the West has been interpreted as a nomadic faction fleeing the westward expansion of the Göktürks, although the specifics are a matter of irreconcilable debate given the lack of clear sources and chronology. Rene Grousset links the Avars with the downfall of the Hephthalites rather than the Rouran, while Denis Sinor argues that Rouran-Avar identification is "repeated from article to article, from book to book with no shred of evidence to support it".

Istämi's policy of western expansion brought the Göktürks into Europe. In 576 the Göktürks crossed the Kerch Strait into the Crimea. Five years later they laid siege to Chersonesus; their cavalry kept roaming the steppes of Crimea until 590. As for the southern borders, they were drawn south of the Amu Darya, bringing the Ashina into conflict with their former allies, the Sasanian Empire. Much of Bactria (including Balkh) remained a dependency of the Ashina until the end of the century.

Relations with the Byzantine Empire

The Göktürks played a major role with the Byzantine Empire's relationship with the Persian Sasanian Empire. The first contact is believed to be 563 and relates to the incident in 558 where the slaves of the Turks (the Pannonian Avars) ran away during their war with the Hephthalites.

The second contact occurred when Maniah, a Sogdian diplomat, convinced Istämi (known as Silziboulos in Greek writings) of the Göktürks to send an embassy directly to the Byzantine Empire's capital Constantinople, which arrived in 568 and offered silk as a gift to emperor Justin II and where they discussed an alliance. In 569 an embassy led by Zemarchus occurred which was well received and likely solidified their alliance for war.

Another set of embassies occurred in 575-576 led by Valentine which were received with hostility by Turxanthos due to alleged treachery. They required the members of the Byzantine delegation at the funeral of Istämi to lacerate their faces to humiliate them. The subsequent hostility shown by the new ruler Tardu would be matched in Byzantine writings. With the insults reflecting a breakdown of the alliance, the likely cause is that the anger was due to the Turks not having their expectations met from their agreements and realising they were being used when they no longer aligned with the current goals of the Byzantine Empire (who correspondingly lacked trust in the Turks as partners).

Civil war

The Turkic Khaganate split in two after the death of the fourth ruler, Taspar Qaghan, c. 583. He had willed the title of khagan to Muqan's son Apa Qaghan, but the high council appointed Ishbara Qaghan instead. Factions formed around both leaders. Before long, four rivals claimed the title. They were successfully played off against each other by the Sui and Tang dynasties.

The most serious contender was the western one, Istämi's son Tardu, a violent and ambitious man who had already declared himself independent from the Qaghan after his father's death. He now seized the title and led an army east to claim the seat of imperial power, Otukan.

In order to buttress his position, Ishbara of the Eastern Khaganate applied to Emperor Yang of Sui for protection. Tardu attacked Chang'an, the Sui capital, around 600, demanding Emperor Yangdi end his interference in the civil war. In retaliation, Sui diplomacy successfully incited a revolt of Tardu's Tiele vassals, which led to the end of Tardu's reign in 603. Among the dissident tribes were the Uyghurs and Xueyantuo.

Eastern Turkic Khaganate

The civil war left the empire divided into eastern and western parts. The eastern part, still ruled from Otukan, remained in the orbit of the Sui and retained the name Göktürk. The Shibi Khan (609–619) and Illig Qaghan (620–630) attacked the Central Plain at its weakest moment during the transition between the Sui and Tang. Shibi Khan's surprise attack against Yanmen Commandery during an imperial tour of the northern frontier almost captured Emperor Yang, but his ethnic Han wife Princess Yicheng—who had been well treated by Empress Xiao during an earlier visit—sent a warning ahead, allowing the emperor and empress time to flee to the commandery seat at present-day Daixian in Shanxi. This was besieged by the Turkic army on September 11, 615, but Sui reinforcements and a false report from Princess Yicheng to her husband about a northern attack on the khaganate caused him to lift the siege before its completion.

In 626, Illig Qaghan took advantage of the Xuanwu Gate Incident and drove on to Chang'an. On September 23, 626, Illig Qaghan and his iron cavalry reached the bank of the Wei River north of Bian Bridge (in present-day Xianyang, Shaanxi). On September 25, 626, Li Shimin (later Emperor Taizong of Tang) and Illig Qaghan formed an alliance by sacrificing a white horse on Bian Bridge. The Tang paid compensation and promised further tribute, so Illig Qaghan ordered his iron cavalry to withdraw. This is known as the Alliance of the Wei River (渭水之盟), or the Alliance of Bian Qiao (便橋會盟 / 便桥会盟). All in all, 67 incursions into China proper were recorded.

Before mid-October 627, heavy snows on the Mongolian-Manchurian grassland covered the ground to a depth of several feet, preventing the nomads' livestock from grazing and causing a massive die-off among the animals. According to the New Book of Tang, in 628, Taizong mentioned that "There has been a frost in midsummer. The sun had risen from same place for five days. The moon had had the same light level for three days. The field was filled with red atmosphere (dust storm)."

Illig Qaghan was brought down by a revolt of his Tiele vassal tribes (626–630), allied with Emperor Taizong of Tang. This tribal alliance figures in Chinese records as the Huihe (Uyghur).

On March 27, 630, a Tang army under the command of Li Jing defeated the Eastern Turkic Khaganate under the command of Illig Qaghan at the Battle of Yinshan (陰山之戰 / 阴山之战). Illig Qaghan fled to Ishbara Shad, but on May 2, 630 Zhang Baoxiang's army advanced to Ishbara Shad's headquarters. Illig Qaghan was taken prisoner and sent to Chang'an. The Eastern Turkic Khaganate collapsed and was incorporated into the Jimi system of Tang. Emperor Taizong said, "It's enough for me to compensate my dishonor at Wei River."

Western Turkic Khaganate

The Western khagan Sheguy and Tong Yabghu Qaghan constructed an alliance with the Byzantine Empire against the Sasanian Empire and succeeded in restoring the southern borders along the Tarim and Amu Darya rivers. Their capital was Suyab in the Chu River valley, about 6 km south east of modern Tokmok. In 627 Tung Yabghu, assisted by the Khazars and Emperor Heraclius, launched a massive invasion of Transcaucasia which culminated in the taking of Derbent and Tbilisi (see the Third Perso-Turkic War for details). In April 630 Tung's deputy Böri Shad sent the Göktürk cavalry to invade Armenia, where his general Chorpan Tarkhan succeeded in routing a large Persian force. Tung Yabghu's murder in 630 forced the Göktürks to evacuate Transcaucasia.

Western Turkic Khaganate was modernized through an administrative reform of Ashina clan (reigned 634–639) and came to be known as the Onoq. The name refers to the "ten arrows" that were granted by the khagan to ten leaders (shads) of its two constituent tribal confederations, the Duolu (five churs) and Nushibi (five irkins), whose lands were divided by the Chui River. The division fostered the growth of separatist tendencies. Soon, chieftain Kubrat of the Dulo clan, whose relation ship with the Duolu is possible but not proven, seceded from the Khaganate. The Tang dynasty campaigned against the khaganate and its vassals, the oasis states of the Tarim Basin. The Tang campaign against Karakhoja in 640 led to the retreat of the Western Turks, who were defeated during the Tang campaigns against Karasahr in 644 and the Tang campaign against Kucha in 648,  leading to the 657 conquest of the Western Turks by the Tang general Su Dingfang. Emperor Taizong of Tang was proclaimed Khagan of the Göktürks.

In 657, the Tang emperor could impose indirect rule along the Silk Road as far as modern-day Iran. He installed two khagans to rule the ten arrows (tribes) of Göktürks.  Five arrows of Tulu (咄陆) were ruled by khagans bearing the title of Xingxiwang (興昔亡可汗) while five arrows of Nushipi (弩失畢可汗) were ruled by Jiwangjue (繼往絕可汗). Five Tulu corresponded to the area east of Lake Balkash while five arrows of Nushipi corresponded to the land east of the Aral Sea.  Göktürks now carried Chinese titles and fought by their side in their wars. The era spanning from 657 to 699 in the steppes was characterized by numerous rulers – weak, divided, and engaged in constant petty wars under the Anxi Protectorate until the rise of Turgesh.

Gallery

See also

 Göktürk family tree
 Turks in the Tang military
 Horses in East Asian warfare
 Kangly
 Orkhon inscription
 Kürşat (hero)
 Qaghans of the Turkic khaganates
 Timeline of the Turkic peoples (500–1300)
 Ashide

References

External links
 Turk Bitig

Bibliography

Mackerras, Colin, The Uighur Empire: According to the T'ang Dynastic Histories, A Study in Sino-Uighur Relations, 744–840. Publisher: Australian National University Press, 1972. 226 pages, 

 .

 Xue, Zongzheng (薛宗正). (1992). Turkic peoples (突厥史). Beijing: 中国社会科学出版社. ; OCLC 28622013

Ashina tribe
552 establishments
Göktürks
Former countries in Chinese history
Historical transcontinental empires
Former empires